The 2017 EADC Tour series consisted of 6 darts tournaments on the 2017 PDC Pro Tour.

February

EADC Tour 1
EADC Tour 1 was contested on Saturday 25 February 2017 at the Omega Plaza Business Center in Moscow.

EADC Tour 2
EADC Tour 2 was contested on Sunday 26 February 2017 at the Omega Plaza Business Center in Moscow.

March

EADC Tour 3
EADC Tour 3 was contested on Saturday 25 March 2017 at the Omega Plaza Business Center in Moscow.

EADC Tour 4
EADC Tour 4 was contested on Sunday 26 March 2017 at the Omega Plaza Business Center in Moscow.

April

EADC Tour 5
EADC Tour 5 was contested on Saturday 29 April 2017 at the Omega Plaza Business Center in Moscow.

EADC Tour 6
EADC Tour 6 was contested on Sunday 30 April 2017 at the Omega Plaza Business Center in Moscow.

References

2017 in darts
2017 PDC Pro Tour